The Embassy of the State of Palestine in New  Delhi is the diplomatic mission of the Palestine in India. It is located in Chanakyapuri in New Delhi.

See also

 India–Palestine relations
 Diplomatic missions in India
 Diplomatic missions of the State of Palestine

References

Diplomatic missions in India
India
Palestine
India–State of Palestine relations